The San Diego Film Critics Society Award for Best Supporting Actor is an award given by the San Diego Film Critics Society to honor the finest male acting achievementes in film-making.

Winners

1990s

2000s

2010s

2020s

References
San Diego Film Critics Society  - Awards

Film awards for supporting actor